Léon Renard, born 16 March 1836 in Valenciennes (Nord), died 5 January 1916 in the same town, was a French politician.

Biography 

The son of a general agent in the mines of Anzin, he graduated from the école centrale des arts et manufactures in 1857. He worked in the glassworks at Fresnes and became president of the union of master glassmakers of the North of France. The administrator of the forges in Maubeuge, and representative for the mines of Anzin, he became councillor for the arrondissement in 1851 and judge of commercial tribunals in 1867. He was elected to député of the 2nd circonscription of Valenciennes from 1876 to 1878, representing the Bonapartist group Appel au peuple, and for the 1st circonscription of Valenciennes 1889 to 1893, representing the Union des droites.

During the debates on the creation of a minor delegate, he proposed multiple amendments to reduce the scope of the text, including introducing a balance against the limits placed on mine owners.

References

Sources 
 

Valenciennes
1836 births
People from Valenciennes
1916 deaths
Members of the 1st Chamber of Deputies of the French Third Republic
Members of the 2nd Chamber of Deputies of the French Third Republic
Members of the 4th Chamber of Deputies of the French Third Republic
Members of the 5th Chamber of Deputies of the French Third Republic
Appel au peuple